Lycée international de Ferney-Voltaire is a public secondary school in Ferney-Voltaire, Ain, Auvergne-Rhône-Alpes, France. The school serves junior high school (collège) and senior high school/sixth form college (lycée) students. It has a branch campus in Saint-Genis-Pouilly.

The school has British, Dutch, German, Italian, Spanish, and Swedish sections. In addition to Ferney-Voltaire and Saint-Genis-Pouilly, it serves Prévessin-Moëns.

 it had about 1,000 junior high students and 1,655 senior high/sixth-form students, making a total of about 2,655 students.

History
It was established with 28 6ème students in 1961 as the Collège d’enseignement général de Ferney-Voltaire, becoming the Collège d’enseignement secondaire municipal de Ferney-Voltaire in 1970. The following year its 2nd class opened with 70 students, and the school was nationalised in 1972. It was made an international school by decree of 21 March 1978. Its current main campus opened in 1983. A senior high expansion and boarding facility opened in 1992.

The Saint Genis Pouilly branch campus opened in 2016. it is in the Porte de France Nord development and occupies .

References

External links
 Lycée international de Ferney-Voltaire 
  

Lycées in Ain
Schools in Ain
Secondary schools in France
1961 establishments in France
Educational institutions established in 1961
Boarding schools in France